James K. Sebenius is an American economist, currently the Gordon Donaldson Professor of Business Administration at Harvard Business School as well as co-founder and partner of Lax Sebenius LLC, specializes in analyzing and advising corporations and governments worldwide on their most complex and challenging negotiations.

Formerly on the faculty of Harvard's Kennedy School of Government, Sebenius also currently serves as Vice-Chair and as a member of the Executive Committee of the Program on Negotiation (PON) at Harvard Law School. At PON, he chairs the University's annual Great Negotiator Award program, which has recognized negotiators such as Richard Holbrooke, Lakdhar Brahimi, George Mitchell, and Bruce Wasserstein. He also co-directs a project to extensively interview all former U.S. Secretaries of State— including James Baker, George Shultz, Henry Kissinger, Madeleine Albright, Colin Powell, Condoleezza Rice, and John Kerry—about their most challenging negotiations.

Sebenius is the author or co-author or editor of five books including 3D Negotiation (Harvard Business School Press), The Manager as Negotiator (Free Press), and, most recently, Kissinger the Negotiator: Lessons from Dealmaking at the Highest Level (HarperCollins). Together with these books, his published output includes more than 250 items including articles, case studies, and negotiation simulations.

Most recently, his academic work has centered on the role of social media in shaping the theory and practice of negotiation. In May 2020, he co-chaired a Program on Negotiation conference on AI, Technology, and Negotiation, where he presented a panel discussion on "The Potentially Critical Roles of Social Media in Negotiation." In 2021, Sebenius published an article in the Negotiation Journal on "Dealmaking Disrupted: The Unexplored Power of Social Media in Negotiation", and along with co-authors Ben Cook, David Lax and Paul Levy he published a Harvard Business Review article outlining a "Playbook for Negotiators in the Social Media Era."

He holds a B.A., summa cum laude, from Vanderbilt in mathematics, an M.S. from Stanford’s Engineering School, and a Ph.D. in business economics from Harvard. He is married to Nancy Buck; their children are Zander, Alyza, and Isaac.

Education

Sebenius has a Ph.D. from Harvard in business economics, a master's degree in Engineering-Economic Systems from Stanford's Engineering School, and a bachelor's degree from Vanderbilt in mathematics and English.

References

Year of birth missing (living people)
Living people
Harvard Business School faculty
American economists
Harvard University alumni
Stanford University School of Engineering alumni
Vanderbilt University alumni